Indira Productions   is an Indian film production company, established by Manjula Ghattamaneni daughter of actor Krishna.

Film production

Awards

References

External links
 Indira Productions on Facebook
  on youtube.com

Film production companies based in Hyderabad, India
Year of establishment missing